Rev. Kyōki Roberts (OPW) is a retired American Sōtō Zen priest. The single Dharma heir of Nonin Chowaney-roshi, Roberts received Dharma transmission in June 2001 and was a member of an organization of priests known as the Order of the Prairie Wind (OPW), which is now defunct. She studied Zen in Japan and in the United States.

Roberts blended her practice with art during the 2003 exhibition Gestures: An Exhibition of Small Site-Specific Works at The Mattress Factory Museum in Pittsburgh. Her installation exhibit, No where to go; nothing to do: Just Sitting, invited visitors to experience aspects of Zazen (seated meditation).

In March 2006, Roberts served as a member of the Plenary Panel of Venerable Women: Women Living the Dharma in the 21st Century during the first Buddhist Women's Conference held at DePaul University and sponsored by the Buddhist Council of the Midwest.

See also
Buddhism in the United States
Timeline of Zen Buddhism in the United States

References

Soto Zen Buddhists
Zen Buddhist priests
American Zen Buddhists
Female Buddhist spiritual teachers
Living people
Year of birth missing (living people)